Stahlberg may refer to:

 Stahlberg, a municipality in Germany
 Stahlberg Models, a promotional model car company from Finland
 Georg Stahlberg (1866–1942), Estonian opera singer and music pedagogue
 Henning Stahlberg (born 1965), German physicist and professor
 Jan Henrik Stahlberg (born 1970), German actor and film director
 Nico Stahlberg (born 1991), Swiss rower